Eligminae is a subfamily of the moth family Nolidae.

Genus and species 
 Eligma Hübner, 1819
 Eligma allaudi Pinhey, 1968
 Eligma bettiana Prout, 1923
 Eligma duplicata Aurivillius, 1892
 Eligma hypsoides Walker, 1869
 Eligma laetepicta Oberthür, 1893
 Eligma malgassica Rothschild, 1896
 Eligma narcissus Cramer, 1775
 Eligma neumanni Rothschild, 1925
 Eligma orthoxantha Lower, 1903
 Gadirtha Walker, [1858]
Gadirtha fusca Pogue, 2014
Gadirtha impingens Walker, [1858]
Gadirtha inexacta Walker, [1858]
Gadirtha pulchra Butler, 1886